Artur Kozłowski (born 19 January 1985) is a long-distance runner from Poland. He finished 39th in the marathon at the 2016 Olympics.

Kozłowski took up athletics around the age of 16. He has a degree in information technology from the University of Łódź. He is married to Paulina.

References

1985 births
Living people
Polish male long-distance runners
Polish male middle-distance runners
Polish male marathon runners
Olympic athletes of Poland
Athletes (track and field) at the 2016 Summer Olympics
People from Sieradz